The Kaiman class were a class of submarines built for the Imperial Russian Navy before World War I. They were designed by Simon Lake and built at the W:m Crichton & C:o Okhta shipyard in Saint Petersburg. The boats had numerous defects resulting in a legal battle between Lake and the Russian Government. The boats were impounded in 1910 and rebuilding work took place to remedy some of the defects. The boats finally commissioned in 1911 and served in the Baltic Fleet.

Ships

All four ships were built by Crichton Yard, Saint Petersburg, served in the Baltic Fleet and were scuttled in Reval in February 1918 to prevent capture by the Germans.

Notes

Bibliography 

 
 

Submarine classes
Submarines of the Imperial Russian Navy